The Yunggor were an Aboriginal Australian people of the Northern Territory.

Language
The Yunggor spoke a dialect of Matngele, one of the Daly languages. The language has died out, and was recorded in the 1960s only from two aborigines who remembered it as a second language.

Country
According to Norman Tindale, the Yunggor were one of several small tribes, with an estimated  of land covering the swampland west of Hermit Hill, and south of the Daly River.

People
The Yunggor may have been a clan of the Ngolokwangga, a view which seems to be implied, according to Tindale, by the work of Herbert Basedow. Tindale adds however that W. W. H. Stanner, who did intense fieldwork in area some decades later, was of the opinion that the Yunggor were a fully-fledged tribe.

Mythology
The Yunggor shared the traditional stories of creation, recited on ceremonial occasions, which were common to that area, in which the Wawalag (Wauwaluk) sisters figured prominently and were closely linked to the Gunabibi legendary mother figure. The Wawalag sisters have a key function in three distinct rituals: (a) the djunggawon ceremony, where dancers perform the swallowing of the two by a python; (b) the kunapipi story, which is reenacted to relate the swallowing of young men, and (c) the ngurlmag rite which concerns details about the Wawalag sisters' shelter.

Alternative names
 Junggor

Notes

Citations

Sources

Aboriginal peoples of the Northern Territory